Andrena subopaca is a Palearctic species of mining bee.

References

External links
Images representing Andrena subopaca 

Hymenoptera of Europe
subopaca
Insects described in 1848